An accession number, in bioinformatics, is a unique identifier given to a DNA or protein sequence record to allow for tracking of different versions of that sequence record and the associated sequence over time in a single data repository.  Because of its relative stability, accession numbers can be utilized as foreign keys for referring to a sequence object, but not necessarily to a unique sequence.  All sequence information repositories implement the concept of "accession number" but might do so with subtle variations.

LRG

Locus Reference Genomic (LRG) records have unique accession numbers starting with LRG_ followed by a number. They are recommended in the Human Genome Variation Society Nomenclature guidelines as stable genomic reference sequences to report sequence variants in LSDBs and the literature.

Notes and references
  
 

Bioinformatics